Elizabeth Charlotte of the Palatinate (19 November 1597 – 26 April 1660) was an Electress consort of Brandenburg as the wife of George William, Elector of Brandenburg and Duke of Prussia, and the mother of Frederick William of Brandenburg, the "Great Elector".

Biography
Elizabeth Charlotte was the daughter of Frederick IV, Elector Palatine, and Louise Juliana of Orange-Nassau. Her brother Frederick became famous as the Elector-Palatine and "Winter King" of Bohemia.

In 1616 Elizabeth Charlotte married George William, with whom she had three children.

The marriage was arranged to unite two Protestant dynasties. In 1618, her brother's deposition from the throne of Bohemia caused the Thirty Years' War. Her spouse was described as ambivalent and passive, but Charlotte ensured protection for her sibling when Brandenburg sided against Austria in the affairs of Bohemia and the Holy Roman Empire. At court, she favoured the Protestant party against the pro-Austrian party. She influenced her son to sympathize with the Protestant cause, and he came to have a great affection for his mother, closer than what was usually common during that age. She spent her last years at Crossen, where she died.

Issue
 Louise Charlotte (1617–1676), married Jacob Kettler, Duke of Courland
 Frederick William (1620–1688), the "Great Elector"
 Hedwig Sophia (1623–1683), married William VI, Landgrave of Hesse-Kassel (or Hesse-Cassel)

Ancestry

References
 Ernst Daniel Martin Kirchner: Die Kurfürstinnen und Königinnen auf dem Throne der Hohenzollern, 2. Teil: Die letzten acht Kurfürstinnen, Berlin 1867, S. 182-220 (mit Portrait Elisabeth Charlottes von der Pfalz).
 Erdmannsdörfer: Elisabeth Charlotte von der Pfalz. In: Allgemeine Deutsche Biographie (ADB). Band 6, Duncker & Humblot, Leipzig 1877, S. 15 f.

|-

|-

Elizabeth Charlotte
Elizabeth Charlotte
Elizabeth Charlotte
1597 births
1660 deaths
Consorts of Brandenburg
Elizabeth Charlotte
Prussian royal consorts
Electresses of Brandenburg
Elizabeth Charlotte
17th-century German women
17th-century German people
Burials at Berlin Cathedral
Daughters of monarchs